Love Is a Wonderful Thing may refer to :

"Love Is a Wonderful Thing" (Michael Bolton song), single
"Love Is a Wonderful Thing" (Peggy Zina song), single, entered in Eurovision Song Contest

See also
"Love's Such a Wonderful Thing", song by The Real Thing
"What a Wonderful Thing Love Is", song by Al Green